The office of the Moderator of the General Assembly was the highest elected position in the Presbyterian Church in the United States (PCUS).  The Moderator was responsible for presiding over the meeting of the General Assembly, which was held annually between 1861 and 1983.  After the meeting, which lasted for about a week, the Moderator served as an ambassador of the denomination throughout the remainder of the term.  After completing the term, most former Moderators took on the role of a church statesman.

The chart below shows the Moderators, and the place of meetings, from 1861 when the PCUS was formed by secession from the Presbyterian Church in the United States of America, until 1983 when the PCUS merged with the United Presbyterian Church in the United States of America to form the present day Presbyterian Church (USA).

Moderators of PCUS General Assemblies

See also
List of Moderators of the General Assembly of the United Presbyterian Church in the United States of America
List of Moderators of the General Assembly of the Presbyterian Church (USA)

References

Presbyterian Church (USA)
American Christian clergy
Moderators